Gregory Allen Blankenship  (born March 24, 1954) is a former American football linebacker who played one season in the National Football League (NFL) with the Oakland Raiders and the Pittsburgh Steelers.

Early life
Blankenship   was born in Vallejo, California and attended Vallejo High School.

College football
He matriculated at Cal State-Hayward (since renamed California State  University, East Bay).  As a sophomore, Blankenship was named to the third-team Associated Press small college All-America football team in 1973.  In 1974, he was named to the UPI Little All-Coast football team.  After his senior season he was named to the Associated Press College Division All-America team as a first-team selection.

Blankenship has been inducted into the California State University, East Bay Athletics Hall of Fame.

Pro football  career
Blankenship went undrafted in the 1976 NFL Draft, but was signed by the Oakland Raiders.  He played four games for the Raiders before being cut.

He was picked up by the Steelers about a month later, primarily to serve as a special teams player.  He played for the Steelers in the final six games of the 1976 season.

Blankenship was cut by the Steelers prior to the 1977 season.  He was picked up in 1978 by the British Columbia Lions of the Canadian Football League.

References

1954 births
Living people
Sportspeople from Vallejo, California
Players of American football from California
American football linebackers
Oakland Raiders players
Pittsburgh Steelers players
American players of Canadian football
Cal State Hayward Pioneers football players